The Front Room is an upcoming American psychological horror film written and directed by the Eggers Brothers in their feature film debut. The film stars Brandy Norwood, Kathryn Hunter and Andrew Burnap.

Cast
 Brandy Norwood
 Kathryn Hunter
 Andrew Burnap

Production
On August 25, 2022, it was reported the Eggers Brothers would write and direct The Front Room, a psychological horror film starring Brandy Norwood, Kathryn Hunter and Andrew Burnap. In mid-February 2023, Screen Daily reported that the film is in post-production.

Release
The film will be distributed by A24 in the United States and Gaga Corporation in Japan.

References

External links
 

American psychological horror films
Upcoming films
A24 (company) films
2020s English-language films
2020s American films